"Real Love" is a song by English electronic group Clean Bandit and English singer and songwriter Jess Glynne. It was released on 16 November 2014 as a joint single, taken from the special edition of the group's album New Eyes and Glynne's album I Cry When I Laugh. The two previously collaborated on "Rather Be". "Real Love" reached number one in Israel and in the UK Dance Chart.

Background
After the huge success of Clean Bandit's song "Rather Be", which Glynne featured on, they decided to collaborate again after the writing collective The Six presented them with "Real Love". It was released on 16 November 2014 as a digital download.

Commercial performance
On the UK Singles Chart, the song debuted at number two, becoming Clean Bandit's third UK top 10 hit and Glynne's fourth. As of November 2016, its UK sales stand at over 682,000. The song made the top 40 in several European countries, managing to reach a height of number two in Germany. It also reached number 13 in Australia. In 2015, it was released on US dance radio and peaked at number 20 on the Dance Club Songs chart.

Music video
The music video was made by Clean Bandit and features some of their fans kissing, interspersed with clips of Clean Bandit and Glynne performing the song in a studio. The video was released on 20 October 2014 and has since then received nearly 80 million views on YouTube as of March 2018.

Cover versions
In 2015, Lower Than Atlantis released a Live Lounge performance of the song on the 2015 reissue of their self-titled album. For a short time, a bootleg from producer 5erg was released on iTunes without permission from Clean Bandit. It was later taken down.

Track listing

Charts

Weekly charts

Year-end charts

Certifications

Release history

References

2014 songs
Clean Bandit songs
Jess Glynne songs
Number-one singles in Israel
Songs written by Jin Jin (musician)
Songs written by Richard Boardman
Songs written by Jack Patterson (Clean Bandit)
Songs written by Jess Glynne
Songs written by Grace Chatto
Songs written by Sarah Blanchard
Songs written by Robert Harvey (musician)